Harold Galper (born April 18, 1938) is an American jazz pianist, composer, arranger, bandleader, educator, and writer.

Biography
He was born in Salem, Massachusetts, United States. Galper studied classical piano as a boy, but switched to jazz which he studied at the Berklee College of Music from 1955 to 1958.  He hung out at Herb Pomeroy's club, the Stable, hearing local Boston musicians such as Jaki Byard, Alan Dawson and Sam Rivers. Galper started sitting in and became the house pianist at the Stable and later on, at Connelly's and Lenny's on the Turnpike. He went on to work in Pomeroy's band.

Later on he worked with Chet Baker and Stan Getz and accompanied vocalists Joe Williams, Anita O'Day, and Chris Connor.

Between 1973 and 1975, Galper played in the Cannonball Adderley Quintet replacing George Duke. He performed in New York and Chicago jazz clubs in the late 1970s. Around this time, Galper recorded several times with guitarist John Scofield for the Enja label.

For 10 years (1980–1990) he was a member of Phil Woods's quintet.

Galper left the Woods group in August 1990 to start touring and recording with his new trio with Steve Ellington on drums and Jeff Johnson on bass. From 1990 to 1999, his group was on the road six months a year.

Galper is internationally known as an educator. His theoretical and practical articles have appeared in six of Down Beat editions.  His scholarly article on the psychology of stage fright, originally published in the Jazz Educators Journal, has subsequently been reprinted in four other publications.

He is on the faculty of Purchase College and the New School for Jazz and Contemporary Music.

Discography

As leader

As sideman
With Cannonball Adderley
 Inside Straight (Fantasy, 1973)
 Love, Sex, and the Zodiac (Fantasy, 1973)
 Pyramid (Fantasy, 1974)

With Nat Adderley
 Double Exposure (Prestige, 1975)

With Franco Ambrosetti
 Heartbop (Enja, 1981)

With Chet Baker
 The Most Important Jazz Album of 1964/65 (Colpix, 1964)
 Baby Breeze (Limelight, 1965)
 Live at Fat Tuesday's (Fresh Sound, 1981)

With Randy Brecker
 Score (Solid State, 1969)

With Tom Harrell
 Open Air (SteepleChase, 1986)

With Sam Rivers
 A New Conception (Blue Note, 1966)

With John Scofield
 Rough House (1978)
 Ivory Forest (1979)

With Phil Woods
 Birds of a Feather (Antilles)
 Bop Stew (Concord)
 Boquet (Concord)
 All Birds Children (Concord)
 Dizzy Gillespie Meets Phil Woods Quintet (Timeless, 1986)

See also
 List of jazz arrangers

Bibliography
Forward Motion: From Bach To Bebop. A Corrective Approach to Jazz Phrasing, AuthorHouse, 17 July 2003, 
The Touring Musician: A Small Business Approach to Booking Your Band on the Road, Alfred Publishing, 10 January 2007,

References

External links

Official site

1938 births
Living people
American jazz pianists
American male pianists
Mainstream Records artists
Enja Records artists
SteepleChase Records artists
20th-century American pianists
21st-century American pianists
20th-century American male musicians
21st-century American male musicians
American male jazz musicians
Cannonball Adderley Quintet members
Double-Time Records artists
Origin Records artists